Løfqvist, Löfkvist, Löfqvist or Lofquist is a surname of Swedish origin. Notable people with the surname include:

Løfqvist
 Bent Løfqvist-Hansen (born 1936), Danish footballer
 Gyrd Løfqvist (1921–2012), Danish film actor

Löfkvist
 Ellen Löfkvist (born 1997), Swedish footballer
 Henrik Löfkvist (born 1995), Swedish footballer
 Oskar Löfkvist (born 1980), Swedish actor
 Thomas Löfkvist (born 1984), Swedish former road bicycle racer

Löfqvist
 Christer Löfqvist (1944-1978), international speedway rider
 Sven William Löfqvist (1947–2016), Swedish ice hockey goaltender

Lofquist
Sam Lofquist (born 1990), American professional ice hockey player

References

Surnames of Swedish origin